Rand is a given name. Notable people with the name include:

Rand Araskog (1931–2021), American businessman
Rand Beers (born 1942), American politician
Rand Brooks (1918–2003), American film actor
Rand Chappell, American basketball coach
Rand Dyck (born 1943), Canadian political scientist
Rand Holmes (1942–2002), Canadian artist
Rand Hummel (born 1956), American preacher and author
Rand Miller (born 1959), American video game designer
Rand Paul (born 1963), American politician and ophthalmologist
Rand Ravich, American screenwriter and producer
Rand Schrader (1945–1993), American activist and judge
Rand Steiger (born 1957), American composer, conductor, and pedagogue

Fictional characters:
Rand al'Thor, the main character in Robert Jordan's The Wheel of Time fantasy fiction series